John Prout (November 21, 1815 – August 28, 1890) was a Vermont attorney, politician, and judge who served as an associate justice of the Vermont Supreme Court from 1867 to 1869.

Biography
John Prout was born in Salisbury, Vermont on November 21, 1815, the son of John C. Prout (1795–1877) and Phebe (or Phoebe) Holman (1793–1836).  He was educated in Salisbury, and then apprenticed as a printer.  After working in the printing business for several years, Prout studied law with Ebenezer N. Briggs.  He attained admission to the bar in 1837, and began to practice in partnership with Briggs.  originally a member of the Whig Party, Prout represented Salisbury in the Vermont House of Representatives in 1847 and 1848.  From 1848 to 1851 Prout served as State's Attorney of Addison County.

In 1854, Prout moved to the village of Rutland in Rutland Town, where he continued to practice law.  He had different partners at different times, and among them were Walter C. Dunton, Charles Linsley and Aldace F. Walker.  By now a Republican, he represented Rutland in the Vermont House in 1865 and 1866, and Rutland County in the Vermont Senate in 1867.  In 1867, Prout succeeded Loyal C. Kellogg as an associate justice of the Vermont Supreme Court, and he served until 1869, when he was replaced by Hoyt H. Wheeler.

After leaving the court, Prout continued to practice law until he retired in 1886.

Death and burial
Prout died in Rutland on August 28, 1890.  He was buried at Evergreen Cemetery in Rutland.

Family
In 1840, Prout married Louisa M. Cook (1823–1848).  After his second wife's death, in 1849 Prout married Sarah P. Smith, who died in 1877.  His third wife, whom he married in 1878, was Ellen Sophia Ellsworth (1824–1897), the widow of George Washington Strong (1818–1858), and a descendant of Oliver Ellsworth.

Prout was the father of three children.  With his first wife, he had a son Edward J. (1847–1888), and a daughter Cornelia Seward (called Emelia) (1847–1920).  With his second wife, he had a daughter, Mary S. (1859–1934).  In 1883, Cornelia Prout married Samuel Howard Field (1842–1892).  In 1890, Mary married Charles H. West, who worked in the banking industry in Rutland, and later served as Rutland's postmaster.

References

Sources

Books

Newspapers

Internet

1815 births
1890 deaths
People from Salisbury, Vermont
People from Rutland (city), Vermont
Vermont lawyers
Vermont Whigs
Vermont Republicans
U.S. state supreme court judges admitted to the practice of law by reading law
State's attorneys in Vermont
Members of the Vermont House of Representatives
Vermont state senators
Justices of the Vermont Supreme Court
Burials at Evergreen Cemetery (Rutland, Vermont)
19th-century American judges
19th-century American lawyers